The 2021 Amstelveen Women's Open was a professional women's tennis tournament played on outdoor clay courts. It was the first edition of the tournament which was part of the 2021 ITF Women's World Tennis Tour. It took place in Amstelveen, Netherlands between 5 and 11 July 2021.

Singles main-draw entrants

Seeds

 1 Rankings are as of 28 June 2021.

Other entrants
The following players received wildcards into the singles main draw:
  Suzan Lamens
  Nikki Redelijk
  Lexie Stevens
  Eva Vedder

The following player received entry using a junior exempt:
  Emma Navarro

The following players received entry as special exempts:
  Quirine Lemoine
  İpek Öz

The following players received entry from the qualifying draw:
  Cristiana Ferrando
  Jaimee Fourlis
  Joanna Garland
  Verena Meliss
  Tayisiya Morderger
  Yana Morderger
  Andreea Prisăcariu
  Ioana Loredana Roșca

Champions

Singles

 Quirine Lemoine def.  Yana Morderger, 7–5, 6–4

Doubles

  Suzan Lamens /  Quirine Lemoine def.  Amina Anshba /  Anastasia Dețiuc, 6–4, 6–3

References

External links
 2021 Amstelveen Women's Open at ITFtennis.com
 Official website

2021 ITF Women's World Tennis Tour
2021 in Dutch sport
July 2021 sports events in the Netherlands